Cliddesden is a parish in Hampshire, England located 3 miles south of Basingstoke, close to the M3 motorway. In the 2001 census it had a population of 489, increasing to 497 at the 2011 Census.  The land and housing are currently protected as it is within a Conservation Zone and has many areas of beauty and rolling countryside.

The village was formerly served by Cliddesden railway station on the now defunct Basingstoke and Alton Light Railway. The station was used in the making of several films. In the 1937 film Oh, Mr Porter!, Cliddesden appeared as 'Buggleskelly'.  A short length of railway track was installed in the centre of the Viables Roundabout in Basingstoke in 1976 to commemorate the line at a point close to its original route. The B3046 runs through the village centre.

About  to the southwest lies one of the highest points on the Hampshire Downs, Farleigh Hill (208 m).

Location
Position: 

Nearby towns and cities: Alton, Andover, Basingstoke, Newbury, Winchester

Nearby villages: Axford, Dummer,  Ellisfield, Farleigh Wallop,  Herriard, Hook, Kingsclere, North Waltham, Oakley, Old Basing, Overton, Steventon, Whitchurch.

References

External links

Organisations
 Cliddesden Village Hall
 Cliddesden Community Conservation Group (3CG)
 Cliddesden Primary School
 St Leonard's Church, Cliddesden
Environment
 Village Design Statement
 Conservation Area Appraisal
Miscellaneous
 
 Basingstoke and Alton Light Railway

Villages in Hampshire
Civil parishes in Basingstoke and Deane